The Mainspring is a 1916 American silent drama film directed by Jack Conway and starring Ben F. Wilson, Wilbur Higby and Francelia Billington.

Cast
 Ben F. Wilson as Lawrence Ashmore / Larry Craven 
 Wilbur Higby as Jesse Craven 
 Henry Holland as Richard Creelman 
 Francelia Billington as Edith Craven 
 Clyde Benson as William Ramsdale 
 Raymond Whitaker as Shackleton 
 Marc B. Robbins as Israel Farnum 
 Thomas Jefferson as James Sharp 
 Ed Brady as Jerviss 
 Mary Maurice as Bernice

References

Bibliography
 James Robert Parish & Michael R. Pitts. Film directors: a guide to their American films. Scarecrow Press, 1974.

External links
 

1916 films
1916 drama films
1910s English-language films
American silent feature films
Silent American drama films
Films directed by Jack Conway
American black-and-white films
Universal Pictures films
1910s American films